Crematogaster gordani species of ant in the subfamily Myrmicinae.

References

gordani
Insects described in 2008